Rudolf Keyser (1 January 1803 – 9 October 1864) was a Norwegian historian, archaeologist and educator.

Biography
Jakob Rudolf Keyser was born in Christiania,  now Oslo, Norway. 
He was the son of  Bishop  Johan Michael Keyser ( 1749–1810) and his second wife  Kirsten Margarethe Wangensteen. He was the brother of 
professor Fredrik Wilhelm Keyser and theologian Christian Nicolai Keyser. 

Following studies in Iceland, Rudolf Keyser was appointed as a docent at the Royal Frederick University in Christiania in 1828. He became a professor in 1831 and remained at the  university until he retired in 1862. Keyser was also the first manager for the University Museum of National Antiquities. He cataloged and categorized prehistoric artifacts which had originated from excavations. He did so utilizing the chronological system developed by Christian Jürgensen Thomsen.

Keyser was most commonly associated with the Theory on immigration to Norway.  Keyser was a supporter of the migration theory that the Norse tribes had wandered into Norway from the north and east, a view also shared by Peter Andreas Munch, a former student of Keyser. This theory was inspired in part by the earlier works of Gerhard Schøning. The theory was commonly denounced by many Norwegian historians especially by Ludvig Kristensen Daa. Rudolf Keyser  became a knight in the Order of St. Olav in 1847.<ref>[http://www.snl.no/.nbl_biografi/Gerhard_Sch%C3%B8ning/utdypning Gerhard Schøning] Store norske leksikon Knut Helle, editor</ref>

Selected worksNordmændenes religionsforfatning i hedendommen (1847) Den norske Kirkes Historie under Katholicismen, volume 1 (1856)Den norske Kirkes Historie under Katholicismen, volume 2 (1858)  Norges Historie, volume 1 (1866) Norges Historie, volume 2 (1870) and Samlede Afhandlinger  (1868) 

References

Other sources
Stugu, Ola Svein (2008) Historie i bruk (Oslo: Samlaget) 
Andersen, Per Sveaas (1960)  Rudolf Keyser Embetsmann og Historiker''  (Oslo: Universitetsforlaget)

1803 births
1864 deaths
19th-century Norwegian historians
Old Norse studies scholars
Writers from Oslo
Norwegian literary historians
University of Oslo alumni
Academic staff of the University of Oslo
Order of Saint Olav